Atheists with surnames starting L to M, sortable by the field for which they are mainly known and nationality.

References

surnames L to M